Parasyncalathium is a genus of Asian plants in the dandelion tribe within the daisy family.

Species 
The only known species is Parasyncalathium souliei, native to Tibet, Sichuan, Yunnan, Bhutan, and Myanmar.

References

Cichorieae
Monotypic Asteraceae genera
Flora of Asia